Thornton-le-Moors is a civil parish in Cheshire West and Chester, England. It contains nine buildings recorded in the National Heritage List for England as designated listed buildings.  Of these, one is listed at Grade I, the highest of the three grades, and the others are at Grade II, the lowest grade.  Apart from the village of Thornton-le-Moors, the parish is rural, other than the area north of the A5117 road, which is occupied by an oil refinery.  The listed buildings consist of the village church and associated structures, houses, farmhouses, and farm buildings.

Key

Buildings

References
Citations

Sources

 

Listed buildings in Cheshire West and Chester
Lists of listed buildings in Cheshire